Pemba is a tapered, round-shaped piece of chalk made of limestone that may have different colors, used ritualistically in Afro-Brazilian religions such as Candomblé, Umbanda, Quimbanda and Quiumbanda.

Its main function in rituals is for the writing of the crossed out point, being a sacred spelling may have different geometric shapes and traces, which represents a certain phalanx of spirits or guide. In Candomblé, the points are referred to the different orishas that are worshiped. The powder has use for energy cleansing and protection rituals.

References 

Chalk
Umbanda